65 Cowgate is a multi-storey building situated on the historic Cowgate, Edinburgh, Scotland, which is used each August as a venue complex for the Edinburgh Festival Fringe, the world's largest open access festival. It is currently known during the Fringe as the Bar Bados Complex after the tiki bar on the ground floor, but was previously known by the name Cowgatehead.

The building is programmed during the Fringe by Peter Buckley-Hill as part of his Free Fringe. However, the building was the subject of controversy during the 2015 Fringe when Buckley-Hill and Freestival, previous operators of the building, clashed over who had contractual rights to programme the venue. The situation was eventually resolved in Buckley-Hill's favour, although the controversy, referred to as "Cowgateheadgate", left many comedians without a venue for the Fringe, and out-of-pocket for costs already incurred.

Performers to have appeared at the venue included Viv Groskop and Miranda Hennessy.

References

External links
PBH Free Fringe website
Freestival website

Edinburgh Festival Fringe
Buildings and structures in Edinburgh